Aquiles Este (born c. 1962 in Caracas, Venezuela) is an American semiotician and professor at the University of Miami's School of Business. His research focuses on content management and social media.

Early life and education
Este was born in Caracas, Venezuela. He completed studies in journalism at the Universidad Central de Venezuela. He then enrolled at the Universidade de São Paulo and Universidade Católica de São Paulo, where he graduated summa cum laude with a doctorate degree in semiotics and communication science.

Career
Este was creative vice president for Lowe & Partners, an international advertising agency, precursor of MullenLowe U.S. He also worked as a dean at ProDiseño, a design school in Caracas and taught at the Instituto de Estudios Superiores de Administración (IESA), a business school in Venezuela.

He has also worked on computational linguistics with New York University linguist Ray C. Dougherty. There, he conducted a research project as a visiting scholar at NYU's Department of Media, Culture, and Communication called "interrelation of Charles S. Peirce's concept of sign replication and Marshall McLuhan's media theories." The project was carried out under the guidance of rhetorician Neil Postman.

In 2016, Este coined the term polimercial brands, referring to commercial products and services that need to position themselves on social and political issues, anticipating that in the near future, all commercial brands will be polimercial.

University of Miami School of Business
In 2009, he emigrated to the United States as a skilled immigrant. In the U.S., he later took up a professorship at the University of Miami School of Business.

Este is also a political consultant, having led political campaigns at the state, legislative and presidential levels in the Americas.

Este is also a contributor to newspapers such as The New York Times.

Personal life
Este currently lives in Miami. He is also a classical guitar player who studied under Uruguayan maestro Abel Carlevaro and Brazilian composer Cristina Azuma.

Publications
Bibliography of publications:

 1987. Ideas for an Epistemology of Communication. Universidad Central de Venezuela Press, Caracas, Venezuela.
 1996. Replicant Culture: The New Semiocentric Order Gedisa. Barcelona, Spain. 
 1997. Graphic Design in Venezuela: An Anthology. Centro La Estancia, Caracas, Venezuela.
 2003. Einstein: The King of the Absent-minded. Cyls Editores, Barcelona, Spain. 
 November 2001. "The Revenge of the Nerds." Counterblast Journal of Culture and Communication. New York: Peirce, McLuhan and Company.
 December 2005. TV, our daily bread: Post-TV and hypermedia. Alfa Eds, Caracas, Venezuela.
 November 2008. Dilemmas of the Present. Mondadori Eds, Bogota, Colombia.

References

1962 births
Living people
Venezuelan emigrants to the United States
Venezuelan semioticians